The Protestant church of Damwâld-Moarrewâld or Saint Boniface’s church is a religious building in Damwâld, one of the  medieval churches in Friesland. 

It is a Romanesque church built c. 1200 out of red brick with a straight closed choir dating from the early 16th century and a tower from the 13th century.  The pipe organ was built in 1895 by Bakker & Timmenga.

The church is located on the Weg 4 and was once a Roman Catholic church dedicated to Saint Boniface but became a Protestant church after the protestant reformation. 
It is listed as a Rijksmonument, number 11675.

See also
The Protestant church of Damwâld-Dantumawâld

References

Damwald-Moarrewald
Rijksmonuments in Friesland
Romanesque architecture in the Netherlands
Dantumadiel
Protestant churches in the Netherlands